Óscar Torres (born December 18, 1976) is a Venezuelan former professional basketball player who last played with Marinos de Anzoategui of the Venezuelan League. A 6'6" native of Caracas, Torres played at the shooting guard and small forward positions.

Professional career
Torres became the first Venezuelan-born player in National Basketball Association (NBA) history, when he signed with the Houston Rockets, for the 2001–02 NBA season. Torres averaged 6.0 points over the course of the season, and scored an NBA career-high 28 points against the Cleveland Cavaliers, on December 11, 2001. He spent the next season with the Golden State Warriors, and averaged 3.1 points per game.

Torres led the Russian team Khimki Moscow Region to the 2006 EuroCup finals, before losing to DKV Joventut. Torres was transferred CSKA Moscow, from Khimki, in February 2007, and with them, he won the Russian Championship and the Russian Cup.

He was released from CSKA in June that year. On August 21, 2007, he signed with the Italian League team Climamio Bologna.

National team career
Torres also played with the senior Venezuelan national basketball team at the 2002 and 2006 editions of the FIBA World Cups.

Career statistics

NBA

Regular season

|-
| align="left" | 2001–02
| align="left" | Houston
| 65 || 13 || 16.5 || .396 || .294 || .781 || 1.9 || .6 || .4 || .1 || 6.0
|-
| align="left" | 2002–03
| align="left" | Golden State
| 17 || 0 || 6.4 || .444 || .538 || .700 || .7 || .2 || .2 || .1 || 3.1
|- class="sortbottom"
| align="left" | Career
| align="left" | 
| 82 || 13 || 14.4 || .401 || .317 || .786 || 1.6 || .5 || .4 || .1 || 5.4

EuroLeague

|-
| style="text-align:left;"| 2006–07
| style="text-align:left;"| CSKA Moscow
| 10 || 9 || 23.1 || .500 || .483 || .611 || 4.6 || .9 || 1.1 || .1 || 8.7 || 10.6
|- class="sortbottom"
| style="text-align:left;"| Career
| style="text-align:left;"|
| 10 || 9 || 23.1 || .500 || .483 || .611 || 4.6 || .9 || 1.1 || .1 || 8.7 || 10.6

References

External links
 NBA.com profile
 Torres Buzzer Beater Puts Khimki In Final, from FIBA.com
 Player Profile at Euroleague.net
 Latinbasket.com Profile

1976 births
Living people
BC Khimki players
CB Tarragona players
Fortitudo Pallacanestro Bologna players
Golden State Warriors players
Houston Rockets players
Marinos B.B.C. players
National Basketball Association players from Venezuela
PBC CSKA Moscow players
Shooting guards
Small forwards
Sportspeople from Caracas
Trotamundos B.B.C. players
Türk Telekom B.K. players
Undrafted National Basketball Association players
Venezuelan expatriate basketball people in Italy
Venezuelan expatriate basketball people in Russia
Venezuelan expatriate basketball people in Spain
Venezuelan expatriate basketball people in Turkey
Venezuelan expatriate basketball people in the United States
Venezuelan men's basketball players
2006 FIBA World Championship players
2002 FIBA World Championship players